The Day My Father Became a Bush is a 2016 Dutch drama film directed by Nicole van Kilsdonk. It was shortlisted by the EYE Film Institute Netherlands as one of the eight films to be selected as the potential Dutch submission for the Academy Award for Best Foreign Language Film at the 90th Academy Awards. However, it was not selected, with Layla M. being chosen as the Dutch entry.

Cast
 Celeste Holsheimer as Toda
 Teun Kuilboer as Father

References

External links
 

2016 films
2016 drama films
Dutch drama films
2010s Dutch-language films